Olga Lounová (born March 7, 1981) is a Czech singer-songwriter, actress, model and rally driver. Born and raised in Osečná (Lázně Kundratice) near the town of Liberec. She attended the Jaroslav Ježek Conservatory in Prague studying Musical Theatre and she later received a master's degree in education.

Bio 
Before launching her career as a solo artist, Olga was lead singer and founder of the band Blind Angie and Calathea. She then was the winner of the International Music Competition with the song K výškám ("To Heights") in Latvia and a finalist in the competition in Vitebsk, Belarus.

Her singing career began to soar in 2010 with the release of the song Láska v housce ("Love in a bun")which became the "#1 song of the year" and by her performance as the opening act for PINK. In 2011, she released the studio album Rotující nebe ("Rotating sky") and in 2012 she launched her concert tour of Optický klam ("Optical illusion"), which was later released as a double CD/DVD.

In 2012 and 2013 she followed this up with the hit single Dál za obzor ("Beyond the horizon") with legendary Czech singer, Karel Gott, and her single Brány svaté ("Holy Gates").

In 2015 and 2016 she followed this up with the single Stará žena ("Old Lady"), Jsem optimista ("I'm an Optimist") and English single's When the music's on and  I Own Ya

Olga as an actress 
As an actress, Olga has had a prolific career in film and television and has logged over 1,800 live performances between her concerts and Musical Theatre performances.

She has appeared in 73 episodes of Czech version of Ugly Betty as Patricie as well as numerous episodes of The Mall, Ulice and Vyprávěj.

Olga starred in the 2010 Czech film Tacho for famous husband and wife team Mirjam and Daniel Landa. Other film appearances are in the 2012 release Amputace as Aurora, Román pro ženy as Bludička, and appearances in Blade II, XXX with Vin Diesel, and Ripper.
On stage she has starred in Perfect Wedding, Kat Mydlář, Golem, Dracula, and Carmen. In the late part of 2014, she will appear as Rosie in the premiere of Mamma Mia! in Prague.

Filmography

Television
 Rally s Olgou (2012)
 The Mall (2012) Prima TV
 Ulice (2011—2012) Nova TV
 Vyprávěj (2009—2012) Česka Televize
 Ugly Betty (2008—2009) Prima TV

Film
 Amputace (2012) "Aurora”
 Tacho (2010) "Lucie”
 Roman Pro Zeny (2006) "Bludička”
 Blade II (2002) "Prostitute”
 XXX (Vin Diesel) 2002 "waitress”
 Ripper (2001)

Theatre
 Mamma Mia! (2014) "Rosie”
 Perfect Wedding (2013)
 Kat Mydlař (2011—2013) 
 Golem (2009—2011) 
 Dracula (2009)
 Dobre Placena Prochazka (2009)
 Carmen (2008) "Carmen”
 Olza (2008)
 Malované Na Skle (2008)

Discography

Albums
 Chuť Svobody ("The Taste of Freedom") (2015) Studio Album
 Optický klam ("Optical Illusion") (2013) Double CD/DVD
 Rotující nebe ("Rotating Sky") (2011) Studio Album

Singles
 "Dark water" (2020) Single
 "When The Music's On" (2016) Single
 "Jsem optimista" (2015) Single
 "Brány svaté" (2013) Single
 "Dál za obzor" (2012) Hit-Single-duet with Karel Gott

References

External links

 
 
 Olga Lounova WRC results

Living people
1981 births
Czech film actresses
Czech singer-songwriters
Czech stage actresses
Czech television actresses
Musicians from Liberec
Actors from Liberec